Raising the Bar may refer to:

Film and television
 Raising the Bar (2008 TV series), an American legal drama television series
 Raising the Bar (2013 TV series), an American reality web series about barmaking
 Raising the Bar (2015 TV series), a TVB drama
 "Raising the Bar" (South Park), a 2012, 16th-season episode of the animated TV series South Park
 Raising the Bar (film) a 2015 Australian gymnastics film
 Raising the Bar (film) a 2016 Australian documentary
 Raise the bar (documentary) a 2021 Icelandic documentary

Other
 Raising the Bar (album), a 2018 album by Terri Clark
 FIRST Frenzy: Raising the Bar, the 2004 game for the FIRST Robotics Competition
 Half-Life 2: Raising the Bar, a 2004 coffee table book published by Prima Games
 "Raise the Bar", a song by Australian pop singer Bonnie Anderson

See also
 Moving the goalposts